In mathematics, the Khintchine inequality, named after Aleksandr Khinchin and spelled in multiple ways in the Latin alphabet, is a theorem from probability, and is also frequently used in analysis.

Statement

Let  be i.i.d. random variables 
i.e., a sequence with Rademacher distribution. Let  and let . Then

The sharp values of the constants  were found by Haagerup (Ref. 2; see Ref. 3 for a simpler proof). It is a simple matter to see that  when , and  when .

Haagerup found that

One may note in particular that  matches exactly the moments of a normal distribution.

Uses in analysis

The uses of this inequality are not limited to applications in probability theory.

Generalizations

For the case of Rademacher random variables, Pawel Hitczenko showed that the sharpest version is:

See also 
 Marcinkiewicz–Zygmund inequality
 Burkholder-Davis-Gundy inequality

References

Thomas H. Wolff, "Lectures on Harmonic Analysis". American Mathematical Society, University Lecture Series vol. 29, 2003. 
Uffe Haagerup, "The best constants in the Khintchine inequality", Studia Math. 70 (1981), no. 3, 231–283 (1982).
Fedor Nazarov and Anatoliy Podkorytov, "Ball, Haagerup, and distribution functions", Complex analysis, operators, and related topics, 247–267, Oper. Theory Adv. Appl., 113, Birkhäuser, Basel, 2000.

Theorems in analysis
Probabilistic inequalities